You Won't Forget Me:  The Complete Liberty Singles (Volume 1) is a compilation CD by Jackie DeShannon, released in the UK by Ace Records as catalog number CDCHD-1243 in 2009.  This release is a comprehensive collection of the A and B sides of all Jackie's singles released in the United States on Liberty Records from 1960 through 1965.

Note: "When You Walk In the Room" was also issued in 1964 as the A-side on the Liberty Records single #55735.  The B-side was "Over You."  Liberty Records also planned to release Jackie's next single as #55787 pairing two Burt Bacharach compositions, "What the World Needs Now Is Love" and "A Lifetime of Loneliness".  This single was cancelled and Jackie was moved to the company's Imperial Records label.  These two tracks were then split and released as two separate single releases.

Track listing

Jackie DeShannon albums
2009 compilation albums